Meerza Delawar Hosaen Ahmed was the first Muslim graduate from the University of Kolkata. He is believed to the first Muslim graduate in India. He served as a civil servant and was awarded the title of Khan Bahadur. He was known for his progressive outlook and support for intellectual and cultural awakening of Bengali Muslims.

Early life
Ahmed was born in 1840 in Baubnam in Pargana Arshah, Hooghly district, Bengal Presidency, British India. He graduated from the University of Kolkata, the first Muslim graduate of the college.

Career
Ahmed joined the Indian Civil Service. He retired from the service with the rank of Deputy Magistrate in 1894. He was loyal to the British crown and was an advocate of British rule in India. He was given by the title of Khan Bahadur after retiring. 

After retiring, Ahmed wrote in The Moslem Chronicle, a progressive English Language weekly. He also wrote for The Mussalman. He wrote in the English language and avoided writing in his native Bengali. He published Essays on Mohmmedan Social Reform, a two volume book, by Thacker Spink and Co from Calcutta in 1889.

Death
Ahmed died in 1913.

References

1840 deaths
1913 deaths
People from Hooghly district
University of Calcutta alumni